Penns Neck was a railway station of the Pennsylvania Railroad, in the Penns Neck neighborhood of West Windsor Township, New Jersey. It opened sometime between 1865 and 1875 as an intermediate stop on the newly completed Princeton Branch line, near its midpoint where it crossed the turnpike that is now U.S. Route 1. The location was originally a grade crossing and later a rail bridge.

Penn Central Transportation took over operations in 1968 and discontinued the little-used station on January 31, 1971. The branch line still provides frequent service between Princeton station (on the Princeton University campus) and Princeton Junction (on the Northeast Corridor), as part of NJ Transit Rail Operations.

References

External links
 

Former railway stations in New Jersey
Demolished railway stations in the United States
Railway stations closed in 1971
Former Pennsylvania Railroad stations
Railway stations in Mercer County, New Jersey
West Windsor, New Jersey
Stations on the Princeton Branch